Danikesh (also Romanized as Dānīkesh and Danikosh; also known as Dāneh Kesh and Dankash) is a village in Negel Rural District, Kalatrazan District, Sanandaj County, Kurdistan Province, Iran. At the 2006 census, its population was 557, in 126 families. The village is populated by Kurds.

References 

Towns and villages in Sanandaj County
Kurdish settlements in Kurdistan Province